Archery has been a European Games sport since the inaugural edition.

Editions

Events

Recurve

Compound

Medal table

Participating nations

References
2015 European Games results book
2019 European Games results book

External links
WAE homepage

 
European Games